Pseudonemacladus is a genus of plants in the Campanulaceae. It contains only one known species, Pseudonemacladus oppositifolius, native to north-eastern Mexico (States of San Luis Potosí and Hidalgo).

References

External links

Campanulaceae
Endemic flora of Mexico
Monotypic Campanulaceae genera